Alejandro Miguel Betanzos (born 1962) is an Argentine novelist born in Buenos Aires.

List of works
La máquina solar. Galileo, la verdad frente al dogma, Edhasa, 1996, 
Las tierras exuberantes. En busca del paraiso terrenal, Editorial Sudamericana, 1998, 
Matar al Virrey. Historia de una conspiración, Editorial Sudamericana, 1999, 
Americo Vespucio. Hacia un mar de siete colores, Editorial Sudamericana, 2000, 
Las cárceles de Dios. Una novela sobre la inquisición, Editorial Sudamericana, 2002, 
Inquisición: las cárceles del Santo Oficio, Edhasa, 2004, 
Sócrates: el sabio envenenado, Grijalbo, 2005, 
Los conjurados de Roma, Grijalbo, 2007,

References

1962 births
Argentine male writers
Living people
Writers from Buenos Aires